javad Khoubiari' (born January 5, 1989) is an Iranian footballer who currently plays for Havadar football team.

References 
 Goal Daily
 

Iranian footballers
Living people
Umm Salal SC players
Al-Wakrah SC players
Al-Khor SC players
Expatriate footballers in Qatar
1989 births
People from Shiraz
Iranian expatriate footballers
Qatar Stars League players
Association football midfielders
Sportspeople from Fars province